Dawlance is a Pakistani home appliances brand which is a subsidiary of Turkish company Arçelik. It is based in Karachi. Founded in 1980, it was acquired by Istanbul-based Arçelik in 2016.

Dawlance has three factories, two sites in Karachi and one in Hyderabad, with a total of 4,000 employees. It manufactures washing machines, freezers, split air conditioner and microwave ovens.

In 2015, Dawlance had revenues of $220.6 million selling product's in Pakistan and Middle East. Similarly, its EBITDA earnings amounted to $45 million. It has 37 branches in addition to 750-plus franchises across the country 

It was acquired by Arçelik in November 2016 for $258m, and since then function's a wholly owned brand for Arçelik.

References

External links
 Dawlance - Official website
  - Steady business growth in home appliances

Manufacturing companies based in Karachi
Electronics companies established in 1980
Consumer electronics brands
Home appliance manufacturers of Pakistan
Pakistani brands
Pakistani subsidiaries of foreign companies
Mergers and acquisitions of Pakistani companies
2016 mergers and acquisitions
Pakistani companies established in 1980
Electronics companies of Pakistan